The Man Who Turned White is a 1919 American silent adventure film directed by Park Frame and starring H. B. Warner as a desert shiek. It was produced by Jesse D. Hampton Productions and distributed by Robertson-Cole Company and Exhibitors Mutual Distributing Company. It was rereleased in 1922 by Robertson-Cole.

Cast
H. B. Warner as Captain Rand, aka Ali Zaman
Barbara Castleton as Ethel Lambert (per AFI) 
Wedgwood Nowell as Captain Beverly (credited as Wedgewood Nowell)
Carmen Phillips as Fanina
Manuel R. Ojeda as Jouder
Jay Dwiggins as Monsieur Mirabeau
Walter Perry as Watchman

Preservation status
The Man Who Turned White is a lost film, but snippets or fragments exist at the Library of Congress.

References

External links

1919 films
American silent feature films
Lost American films
American black-and-white films
Films based on short fiction
American adventure films
1919 adventure films
1919 lost films
Lost adventure films
Films directed by Park Frame
1910s American films
Silent adventure films
1910s English-language films